Narito ang Puso Ko is a 1992 Filipino drama film directed by Chito S. Roño. The film stars Lorna Tolentino and Gabby Concepcion. Produced by Viva Films, the film was released on September 30, 1992, and was a box office success. Tolentino's performance won her the title of Grandslam Best Actress, having won all nominations for best actress across the major award giving bodies of the Philippines.

Plot
A woman who regains back her veterinarian husband after their son was accidentally shot by the son of a prominent politician must also do her best to regain back the life of his comatose son to bring back the old happy life they once had.

Cast
Lorna Tolentino as Ellen Cortez Chavez
Gabby Concepcion as Dr. Louie Chavez
Nanette Meved as Suzette
Amy Austria as Dolly Sanchez
Mark Gil as Reynato "Tato" Sanchez
Cherie Pie Picache as Lynette
BB Gandanghari as Joey
Alfred Manal as Carlo Chavez
Paolo Contis as Dondon Sanchez
Rez Cortez
Jon Achaval as Congressman Sanchez

Notes

References

External links

1992 films
Filipino-language films
Philippine drama films
Viva Films films